The Butter and Egg Man is a 1928 American silent comedy film directed by Richard Wallace and starring Jack Mulhall, Greta Nissen, and Sam Hardy. It is based on the 1925 play The Butter and Egg Man. It was remade by the studio's successor company Warner Brothers as a sound film Hello, Sweetheart in 1935.

Plot
A farmer from Ohio comes to Broadway wanting to get into show business. He's persuaded to invest in a production by two men who are scamming him. He gets his revenge when he turns the show into a great success.

Cast
 Jack Mulhall as Peter Jones  
 Greta Nissen as Mary Martin  
 Sam Hardy as Joe Lehman  
 William Demarest as Jack McLure  
 Gertrude Astor as Fanny Lehman

Preservation status
The film is now lost.

References

Bibliography
 James Monaco. The Encyclopedia of Film. Perigee Books, 1991.

External links

1928 films
1928 comedy films
Silent American comedy films
Films directed by Richard Wallace
American silent feature films
1920s English-language films
American black-and-white films
First National Pictures films
Lost American films
1928 lost films
Lost comedy films
1920s American films